Don't Be Afraid of the Dark may refer to:

 Don't Be Afraid of the Dark (album), an album by Robert Cray
 Don't Be Afraid of the Dark (1973 film), a television horror film
 Don't Be Afraid of the Dark (2010 film), a remake of the 1973 film
 Don't Be Afraid of the Dark (American Horror Story), an episode of the anthology television series American Horror Story